Belenitsyno is a rural locality (a village) in Kharovskoye Rural Settlement, Kharovsky District, Vologda Oblast, Russia. The population was 11 as of 2002.

Geography 
Belenitsyno is located 6 km east of Kharovsk (the district's administrative centre) by road. Sogorki is the nearest rural locality.

References 

Rural localities in Kharovsky District